Karan Singh Patel is an Indian politician and member of the Uttar Pradesh Legislative Assembly.

References
 https://www.newsreporter.in/karan-singh-patel-of-bjp-wins-the-bindki-constituency-uttar-pradesh-assembly-election-2017-681901 
 http://myneta.info/ls2009/candidate.php?candidate_id=3918

Living people
1951 births
People from Fatehpur, Uttar Pradesh
Uttar Pradesh MLAs 2017–2022
Bharatiya Janata Party politicians from Uttar Pradesh